The Vesteda tower is located in Eindhoven and was finished in 2006. It bears a resemblance to the Flatiron Building in Manhattan, New York City.

In 2007 it was awarded the BNA Building of the Year plaque (nl), by the Royal Institute of Dutch Architects (nl).

Residential skyscrapers in the Netherlands
Residential buildings completed in 2006
Towers in North Brabant
Buildings and structures in Eindhoven